Januário Correia de Almeida  (31 March 1829 – 27 May 1901) was a Portuguese colonial administrator, military engineer and a diplomat. He was created Baron of São Januário by King Luís I in 1866, Viscount of São Januário in 1867 and Count of São Januário in 1889. He was born in Paço de Arcos (part of Oeiras) on 31 March 1829 as son of Januário Correia de Almeida and Bárbara Luísa dos Santos Pinto. 

He studied at the faculty of mathematics of the University of Coimbra between 1849 and 1853, and after a year at the Army School, he started working as military engineer. He became director of public works in the archipelago of Cape Verde in 1854. He oversaw the construction of many public buildings and structures, including the customs house in Mindelo and the quay of the Port of Praia. In June 1860, he was appointed governor general of Cape Verde, succeeding Sebastião Lopes de Calheiros e Meneses. He was succeeded by Carlos Joaquim Franco on 23 March 1861. 

He returned to Portugal and became governor of Braga District, high commissioner of Vila Real District and then governor of Porto District. On 7 May 1870, he was appointed governor general of Portuguese India, succeeding José Ferreira Pestana. He was succeeded by Joaquim José de Macedo e Couto on 12 December 1871. On 23 March 1872, he was appointed governor of Macau and Timor, succeeding António Sérgio de Sousa. He was succeeded by José Maria Lobo de Ávila in 1874, and became minister plenipotentiary to China, Japan and Siam. Besides his diplomatic work, he was an active member of the Associação dos Arqueólogos Portugueses (Association of Portuguese Archaeologists). He was one of the first European visitors of many monuments in Southeast Asia. 

He returned to Lisbon in 1875 and was one of the founders of the Lisbon Geographic Society and its honorary president. In 1878 he was appointed minister plenipotentiary to the republics of South America, where he also studied the ancient cultures. From 3 June 1880 to 25 March 1881 he was Minister of Navy and the Overseas in the government of Braamcamp. He married Maria Clementina de Lancastre Vasconcelos e Sousa Leme Corte Real on 25 November 1885. They had two daughters. He died in Paço de Arcos on 27 May 1901.

Decorations
He received decorations including:
 Commander of the Order of the Tower and Sword of Portugal
 Grand Cross of the Military Order of Christ of Portugal
 Grand Cross of the Order of the Immaculate Conception of Vila Viçosa of Portugal
 Grand Cross of the Military Order of São Bento de Aviz of Portugal
 Gold Medal of Good Services of Portugal
 Gold Medal of the Exemplary Behaviour of Portugal
 Grand Cross of the Order of Isabella the Catholic of Spain
 Grand Cross of Military Merit of Spain
 Grand Cross of the Order of Saints Maurice and Lazarus of Italy
 Grand Cross of the Royal Order of Cambodia
 Grand Cross of the Order of the Crown of Siam
 Grand Cross of the Order of the Rising Sun of Japan
 Grand-Official of the Legion of Honour of France
 Grand-Official of Public Instructions of France
 Grand Cross of the Order of Leopold of Belgium
 Grand Cross of the Order of the Sword of Sweden
 Dignitary of the Order of the Rose of Brazil

See also
List of colonial governors of Cape Verde
List of governors of Portuguese India
Governor of Macau

References

1829 births
1901 deaths
Colonial heads of Cape Verde
Governors-General of Portuguese India
Portuguese colonial governors and administrators
Grand Crosses of the Order of Christ (Portugal)
Grand Crosses of the Order of Aviz
Knights Grand Cross of the Order of the Immaculate Conception of Vila Viçosa
Naval ministers of Portugal